Christown Spectrum is the oldest operating mall in Phoenix, Arizona and was the third shopping mall built in the city. It is located at 1703 W. Bethany Home Road in Phoenix, Arizona.  The name Christown Spectrum is derived from Chris-Town Mall and Phoenix Spectrum Mall, previous names. Today it exists as an enclosed shopping mall, although the enclosed portion of the mall was greatly reduced when redevelopment changed the configuration closer to a power center. 

Christown Spectrum's anchor stores are SuperTarget, Walmart Supercenter, and American Furniture Warehouse. There is one empty anchor formerly occupied by JCPenney. Christown Spectrum also has Big 5 Sporting Goods, Dollar Tree, PetSmart, Ross Dress for Less, Walgreens and a Harkins Theatres 14.

History

Chris-Town Mall 
Chris-Town Mall was originally named after the farmer, Chris Harri, who sold a large portion of his farmland to the mall's developer, Del Webb in the late 1950s.

Construction was completed in mid-1961. Chris-Town Mall opened with much fanfare on August 24, advertised as the first indoor mall in Arizona. Another first for an Arizona mall was the air-conditioned interior, which may have led to competing Maryvale Mall converting to an indoor mall to stay competitive. The mall's original anchors included Montgomery Ward, JCPenney, and the first branch of the Downtown Phoenix department store Korricks. Other major tenants included S. S. Kresge, & Woolworth. Themed Courtyards served as focal points in front of each of the three major department stores.  The main courtyard at the center entrance that buffered JCPenney was named the Court of Fountains; another named the Court of Flowers ended the east wing near Korrick's, and the Montgomery Ward opened to the final one, named the Court of Birds, in the west wing.

By 1966 the mall already had begun the first of many significant changes as one of the original three anchor department stores, Korricks, was bought by and renamed The Broadway. Also that year the mall's first of two movie theatres broke ground on the southwest side of the main parking lot. And a new subterranean tavern, called The Janitor's Closet, opened in the mall in front of The Broadway, down a winding set of stairs in the basement at the northeast end of the mall.  The second significant change began in 1974 in reaction to Metro Center, the new mega mall that opened just a few miles away. Woolworth's was demolished to make way for the new southwestern wing anchored by a Bullock's department store. While a second new wing on the southwestern side of the mall opened to a United Artists Cinemas 6 on the upper level making it Chris-Town's second movie theatre.  Changes already were underway again by the mid-1980s when Diamond's, which quickly became Dillard's, moved into the southwestern anchor spot vacated by Bullock's short stay at the mall.

The next decade would not be kind to Chris-Town Mall following the rapid closure of many anchor stores beginning with The Broadway in 1994; JCPenney, store #1821, closed in 1997. The bankruptcy of Montgomery Ward on the west end in 2001, the closing of Butler Shoe store in 1990 next to Ward and the closing of a smaller anchor Woolworths across from Wards and Butler Shoes and the closing of the final anchor on the southwest end of the mall, Dillard's, in 2004. The closures of the major department stores and the smaller anchors also brought about the permanent closure of the life sized sand sculptures exhibit that adorned the mall for many years.

Phoenix Spectrum Mall 

Beginning the new millennium the mall underwent a rebirth with a new name, Phoenix Spectrum Mall, and a Grossman Company Properties financed redevelopment was underway.  The new spectrum of discount stores, replacing the old upscale ones, started with the demolition of The Broadway and replacement by Walmart (originally built as a discount store, now expanded into a Supercenter). The $10 million renovation project also included the addition of the first Costco to be located in an enclosed mall, followed by the division of the Wards department store into a PetSmart and Ross Dress for Less. Walgreens, a longtime resident inside the mall located near the center court relocated outside the mall to the northwest corner of the parking lot where JB's Family Restaurant was located, with Big 5 Sporting Goods replacing that location in the mall.

Christown Spectrum 

Following the sale of the mall to Developers Diversified Realty in 2006, Phoenix Spectrum Mall took on a hybrid of its previous names to become known as Christown Spectrum Mall.

At this same time the southwestern wing that was added in 1974 was demolished and replaced by Target, as well as creating space for smaller specialty shops that would no longer be directly connected to the mall. The former United Artists Cinemas and food court were demolished and replaced by a Harkins Theatre with stadium seating which resulted in the Chris-Town Cinemas located in the parking lot to also be demolished. Most of the enclosed section between the old Court of Fountains and the new PetSmart and Costco was demolished for the return of a previous anchor, JCPenney, which relocated from their recently closed location at nearby Metrocenter. This demolition cut off mall access to the Petsmart and Ross, thus  leaving only the center and eastern side as traditional enclosed mall.

In December 2015, Kimco Realty acquired the mall for $115.3 million or $136 per square foot. At that time, the property was 94% occupied.

Today the only remaining original structures are the center entrance, east wing and the Montgomery Ward building although the second floor remains non-leasable space.  The rest of the buildings that housed the original anchors have been razed, along with the movie theatre and the entire western wing.  Although the mall's central complex remains, the fountains were removed shortly after new flooring was added.

On February 11, 2020, it was announced that Costco would be closing. The store officially closed on September 20, 2020. There was an online petition to keep the store from closing, which received over six thousand signatures, but the store still closed on September 20, 2020.

On June 4, 2020, it was announced that JCPenney would also be closing as part of a plan to close 154 stores nationwide. The store closed October 18, 2020.

Light rail 

Christown Spectrum Mall has its own "19th Avenue/Montebello Station" stop on the Valley Metro Rail system.

See also

 Arrowhead Towne Center
 Park Central Mall
 Maryvale Mall
 Desert Sky Mall
 Encanto, Phoenix City of Phoenix, Arizona Urban Villages Map 
 Mesa Riverview 
 Tempe Marketplace 
 Superstition Springs Center
 Fiesta Mall
 Tri City Mall
 Los Arcos Mall
 Metrocenter (Phoenix, Arizona)
 Paradise Valley Mall

References

External links
Official Christown Spectrum website
Chris-Town Retrospective

Buildings and structures in Phoenix, Arizona
Shopping malls established in 1961
Shopping malls in Arizona
Shopping malls in Maricopa County, Arizona
Welton Becket buildings